Oscar Munoz may refer to:

 Oscar Muñoz (artist)  (born 1951), Colombian artist
 Oscar Munoz (baseball) (born 1969), American baseball player
 Oscar Munoz (magician), American magician
 Oscar Munoz (executive) (born 1959), CEO of United Airlines
 Oscar Muñoz (wrestler) (born 1964), Colombian Olympic wrestler
 Oscar Muñoz (footballer), Colombian Olympic football (soccer) player
 Oscar Muñoz (taekwondo) participated in Taekwondo at the 2010 Summer Youth Olympics – Boys' 55 kg